Insiders is an Australian news and talk television program produced by ABC News, and hosted by David Speers.

History 
The program debuted on 15 July 2001, hosted by Barrie Cassidy until June 2019. Similar to the Sunday morning talk shows in the United States, Insiders analyses and discusses Australian politics with the use of a panel of political journalists and columnists and interviews with prominent politicians and commentators.

Broadcast on ABC on Sunday mornings at 9am, the program also features many regular commentators from various Australian media outlets and think tanks. The show is part of the ABC's Sunday morning line-up, commencing with Insiders, followed by Offsiders, a sports program initiated and formerly hosted by Cassidy, and now hosted by Kelli Underwood.

Fran Kelly hosted the show while Barrie Cassidy was on long service leave, and Chris Uhlmann, prior to his move to the Nine Network, also hosted the show in Cassidy's absence.

In March 2019, Cassidy announced he would be leaving Insiders after the 2019 Australian election and after eighteen years in the hosting chair. His last show was on 9 June 2019; regular fill-in presenters Fran Kelly and Annabel Crabb alternated hosting duties until the end of the year

In June 2019, David Speers was announced as Cassidy's replacement from 2020.

Format
As a Sunday morning talk show, the format of the program usually starts with Cassidy discussing the political issues of the week, followed by an interview with a current Australian political figure, usually an Australian politician. Each week in the studio, Cassidy discusses current political issues with a panel of three commentators/journalists of varying political perspectives.

The 2007 series included small changes to the format of the show: re-ordering the segments, commencing the program with the political interview, followed by "Your Shout". Paul Kelly's discussion (this segment was discontinued in 2010) was then used as a starting point for the panel discussion. "Talking Pictures" continues to provide a break point within the panel discussions, and the show concludes with its customary sign-off where Cassidy asks the panel members for their "final observation and predictions".

In 2011, the usual program format began with a brief monologue from Cassidy followed by a brief video summary of the major events of the preceding week.  Then Cassidy reviews the Sunday papers with the studio panel before moving on to the studio guest.  If the guest is present in the studio the interview is introduced by a short video clip relating to the first interview question.  The interview usually lasts until midway through the hour and is followed by a video clip which concentrates on events surrounding a major news topic of the week.  This is followed by a studio discussion between Cassidy and his studio guests.  Cassidy introduces "Talking Pictures" towards the end of the hour, which is followed by more studio discussion.  The show usually winds up with Cassidy introducing amusing or otherwise interesting media clips followed by an observation or prediction from each panel member before Cassidy ends the show with a final media clip or two.

The program's editor, Huw Parkinson, has produced a number of video mashups compositing the faces of political figures onto films and other pop culture footage. Parkinson's videos won him a Walkley Award for multimedia storytelling in 2015.

Regular segments

"Your Shout"
The "Your Shout" segment (which was dropped in 2010) gave a member or group of members of the public a chance to air a grievance or present opinions about topical political issues that concerned them, in a short, pre-recorded segment shown during the program.  It appears that the program attempted to ensure that the members of the public selected from week to week represented a broad range of political opinion and were spread across different parts in Australia.

"Talking Pictures"
Presented by Mike Bowers, the "Talking Pictures" segment analyses political cartoons and photographs featured in the nation's newspapers from the previous week.  Regularly appearing cartoonists include Warren Brown, Bill Leak, Geoff Pryor, Bruce Petty, Alan Moir, Peter Nicholson, Mark Knight, Jon Kudelka, Matt Golding, Paul Batey, Sean Leahy and Fiona Katauskas.

"Poll of Polls"
Presented by Andrew Catsaras, the "Poll of Polls" segment aggregates and reviews political polling from the previous month. This segment commenced in February 2012, appearing during the last week of each month in 2012, moving to the first week of each month in 2013.

Commentators and panelists

Regular

Former

References

External links 
 

Australian Broadcasting Corporation original programming
ABC News and Current Affairs
2001 Australian television series debuts
2010s Australian television series
English-language television shows
Australian Sunday morning talk shows
Television shows set in Melbourne
2020s Australian television series